Eupterote mollifera is a moth in the family Eupterotidae. It was described by Francis Walker in 1865. It is found in India, Myanmar and Sri Lanka.

The wingspan is 64–84 mm. Adults are similar to Eupterote fabia, but are smaller, with the ground colour always yellow or drab in both sexes, often more or less suffused with rufous. The forewings have at most five waved lines within the double postmedial lines, one of which is often obsolete. The hindwings have three lines at most within the postmedial lines and the outer waved line and spots within it are variable.

The larvae are whitish, speckled with black and with dorsal tufts of black hairs arising from a whitish hump. There is a dorsal blue-black band and a subdorsal pinkish band traversed by a grey line, as well as a series of small lateral black spots. The sublateral area is purplish grey with long hairs. The stigmata and legs are pink and the head is black.

Subspecies
Eupterote mollifera mollifera
Eupterote mollifera contrastica Bryk, 1944 (Myanmar)

References

Moths described in 1865
Eupterotinae